{{Speciesbox
| image =
| image_caption =
| taxon = Puncturella erecta
| authority = Dall, 1889 <ref>Dall, W. H. 1889. Reports on the results of dredgings, under the supervision of Alexander Agassiz, in the Gulf of Mexico (1877-78) and in the Caribbean Sea (1879-80), by the U. S. Coast Survey Steamer 'Blake,. Bulletin of the Museum of Comparative Zoology 18: 1–492, pls. 10–40</ref>
| synonyms_ref =
| synonyms = 
Cranopsis erecta (Dall, 1889)
 Puncturella (Cranopsis) erecta Dall, 1889 (basionym)
Puncturella hendersoni Dall, 1927
}}Puncturella erecta''' is a species of sea snail, a marine gastropod mollusk in the family Fissurellidae, the keyhole limpets.

Description
The size of the shell reaches 15 mm.

Distribution
This species occurs in the Gulf of Mexico.

References

 Dall, W. H. 1927. Diagnoses of undescribed new species of mollusks in the collection of the United States National Museum. Proceedings of the United States National Museum 70(2668): 1–11
 Dall, W. H. 1927. Small shells from dredgings off the southeast coast of the United States by the United States Fisheries Steamer 'Albatross' in 1885 and 1886''. Proceedings of the United States National Museum 70(2667): 1–134

Fissurellidae
Gastropods described in 1889